The Big Beat 1963 is a compilation album released on December 17, 2013, exclusively through digital distribution. It features selections of early demos and recordings made by Brian Wilson in the early 1960s with such acts as the Beach Boys and the Honeys.

The compilation's release came as a result of revised European copyright laws, forcing some labels to publish unreleased archival material so that they will not lose their copyright. None of the tracks contained within had been commercially released, although many had appeared on bootlegs.

Track listing

References

2013 compilation albums
The Beach Boys compilation albums
Brian Wilson compilation albums
Albums produced by Brian Wilson
Albums produced by Mark Linett
Capitol Records compilation albums
Compilation albums published posthumously
ITunes-exclusive releases
Copyright extension compilation albums